Blackout Day is a social media-promoted event in which supporters of the Black Lives Matter movement are encouraged to not spend any money, or only spend money at Black-owned businesses for 24 hours, for the purpose of raising awareness of police brutality and racism towards Black people. It also encourages the posting of content that was created by and features black creators. Specific hashtags, such as #TheBlackout and #BlackoutDay, are used to connect users to related content, and to increase the visibility of that content. Blackout Day began on March 6, 2015, and after December 21, 2015, was scheduled to be held on the seventh day of every third month, starting with March 6, 2016.

Blackout Day 2020 has received widespread attention as a result of the murder of George Floyd, the shooting of Breonna Taylor, the death of Elijah McClain, the shooting of Tony McDade, and other victims of police brutality.

Background 
The event was conceived in early February 2015 by Tumblr user T'von Green. Green noticed that there was a lack of black representation on social media, as well as a predominance of Eurocentric standards of beauty, specifically on Tumblr;"Damn, I'm not seeing enough Black people on my dash. Of course I see a constant amount of Black celebrities but what about the regular people? Where is their shine".

In addition, he noticed that when Black people were depicted, it was usually in a negative light. Research has shown that Black images in the media adversely affect how members of the Black community view themselves. These harmful images are not only seen by the Black community, but by everyone who has access to a media outlet. Although images of Black people have increased in mass media, those images have been disproportionately harmful due to their violent and crime related content. Generally, if Black people are not being depicted as criminals, they are represented as entertainers such as athletes or musicians. Having these two polar identities of a lawless individual and highly adored star leaves a spectrum of people in the Black community unrepresented. While associating Blacks with athleticism is not harmful in itself, it becomes harmful when that is one of the only things Blacks are associated with. This reality led to an ethical need for positive and relatable images of the black community on platforms like social media. Concerned about these issues, Green decided to gain feedback on his idea by going on Tumblr; through those interactions, he met Marissa Sebastian, who came up with the name behind the movement and later on became the PR and CEO of the movement, and Tumblr user V. Matthew-King Yarde (known as Nukrik on social media), the creator behind the various logos for the event. Blackout Day was created as a 24-hour event that would expose the online Black community and others on social media to positive images of everyday Black individuals, through selfies, videos, gifs, and other media. Its goal was to shed a positive light on Black individuals, and to combat stereotypes. The idea spread quickly once given a name, and gained supporters within the Black Tumblr community. An official website was created to help the online black community access up to date information on when and how the event would take place. Before the event, the creators posted guidelines on who could participate and how to do so.

After the event launched, the creators decided to make it a monthly event, on every first Friday of every month. However, the frequency was an issue for a majority of supporters, who believed that the event would not have a significant impact if it was too frequent. They felt as though it should be a yearly event on the day it was first launched, which was an issue for the creators, as well as other supporters who thought the frequency should be increased. They changed it to a seasonally themed event that would occur on the 21st of September and December until January 2016, when it would be changed to fall on the 6th of every third month. Each Blackout Day would be themed around black heritage/history, and participants are encouraged to post content surrounding the given theme.

Guidelines 
The guidelines to Blackout Day are:
 If you are Black, either from Africa or from within the African diaspora, mixed (or part) Black, post a picture of yourself for others to view and re-blog/re-tweet/re-post
 Tag or mention #Blackoutday or #TheBlackout
 Scroll through the tag and re-blog, re-tweet or re-post photos within that tag to support others
 People who are not Black/non-Black, or White, can re-blog posts in the tags to show support
 Support people with low numbers of likes and re-blogs as well
Official hashtags used are #TheBlackout and #BlackoutDay.

Reception 
According to Twitter analytic service Topsy, the hashtag #BlackOutDay was one of the top trending hashtags on Twitter in the United States, with over 58,000 tweets by noon, and was a trending topic on Facebook. The creators received national attention for their creative digital activism, and used this attention as leverage to start a dialogue about race and the portrayal of black people in the media, in and out of social media. Outside of social media, they seek to keep the dialogues open through partnerships. They have collaborated with Book Riot, and extended the partnership by sponsoring 22 black avid readers and writers. However, the event did not go without opposition. Hashtags such as #Whiteout were created as a public objection against the movement. The principle was the same as Blackout, but featured selfies of white people. The creators addressed this issue politely by reiterating their movement's goal. Other minority groups have attempted to mimic the movement by creating variations that are similar to the original #Blackoutday, such as #Yellowoutday and #Brownoutday, among others, albeit with little success. The creators suggested that they be more original and create tags that were more distinguishable from theirs.

References 

Political movements
Social media campaigns